Manon Rasmussen (born 2 August 1951 in Horsens) is a Danish costume designer. She is best known for her frequent collaborator with Lars von Trier in all feature works (with the exception of Medea and The Idiots) for wardrobes and designing costumes in four decades since Images of Liberation. She has won 17 Robert Awards for Best Costume Design out of 34 awarded, making it the most wins and nominations in a single category.

Filmography

References

External links 
 
 
 

1951 births
Living people
Costume designers
People from Horsens